Tsapatagh is a resort village in the Shoghakat Municipality of the Gegharkunik Province in Armenia, on the northeastern shore of Lake Sevan.

Geography and nature 

The village is located in the vicinity of the Tandzut river delta (not to be confused with identically named Tandzut river in the Lori province). Other sources indicate different river names, the Tsapatagh river running through the village and the Shishkert  river (or the Shampyrt river) to the southeast of the village. In the surroundings of the village there is a 3,312 hectare large sanctuary with unique relict juniper and open oak woodlands with typical fauna and flora. The climate is somewhat milder than on the western shores and fruit trees like apricot trees can be grown.

Economy and tourism 
The Tufenkian Hotel with adjacent solar photovoltaic installations is located in the village. To the southeast, another much larger photovoltaic station is being constructed as of 2020.

Historical heritage sites 
There is a 3,000-year old burial area three kilometres to the east of the village. In the southeast, about 1.5 kilometres away, there is a cemetery with khachkars dating from between the 14th and 18th centuries.

Demographics

Population 
In 2014 there were 379 residents according to the local administration. In 2018 there was only one child who begun attending the local school.

Many of modern local residents relocated to the village from Kushchu village of Dashkasan, as well as from Baku and Ganja around 1988–1989.  Quite a few of the houses are used only in summer by Yerevan residents.

Gallery

References

External links 

 
 

Populated places in Gegharkunik Province
Mountain resorts in Armenia